Boktai is a video game series created by Hideo Kojima and published by Konami. The series consists entirely of portable games for the Game Boy Advance and Nintendo DS, and is notable for its unique inclusion of a built-in solar sensor required for gameplay. The final game in the series made use of the solar sensor optional, and did not include one by default. The series revolves around vampire hunters who must use sunlight-based weaponry to combat evil undead creatures. Critics praised the games' unconventional design, although the requirement to play the game outdoors, in order to bring the most color out of the screen of the Game Boy Advance, ensured that it had only a niche audience, with the third game in the series not receiving a release outside of Japan.

Games

Boktai: The Sun Is in Your Hand

Boktai 2: Solar Boy Django

Boktai 3: Sabata's Counterattack 
Boktai 3: Sabata's Counterattack was released on July 28, 2005 in Japan with a retail price of ¥4980. In it, Django is able to use both a gun and sword, and action elements were increased, with a corresponding decrease in the amount of puzzles. The game has motorcycle-riding sections in which the player avoids obstacles and defeats enemies. Motorcycles can be customized and raced against other players via Game Link Cable.

The game was never officially released in the West, but received a complete dialog fan translation in 2007, enabling it to be completed in English.

Lunar Knights

Reception 
Jeremy Parish of USgamer called Boktai similar to a mash-up of Metal Gear and Castlevania, although remarking that there was more to it than this, as the games also drew heavily on spaghetti westerns. He called the requirement to charge the player's gun using actual sunlight "baroque and complex", and an "extreme solution", but "perfectly fitting coming from Hideo Kojima, a man known for his love of manipulating audiences and breaking the fourth wall". Citing how he found memorable real-life places to play Boktai, he stated that "the lengths to which I went to complete Boktai made it one of the most memorable gaming experiences I've ever enjoyed".

Lean-Karlo Lemus of Ars Technica called the Boktai series "ultimately a victim of Konami's fickle nature", citing their decision not to release Boktai 3 outside of Japan. He also stated his wish for other games to use similar techniques, saying that while "the Switch Joy-Con and its powerful built-in infrared sensor puts Boktai's UV sensor to shame [...] outside of Nintendo Labo, precious few titles have used it in any meaningful capacity".

Notes

References 

Video game franchises introduced in 2003
Konami franchises
Video games about vampires
Boktai
Video games produced by Hideo Kojima